

Incumbents
Monarch: Christian II

Events
20 July - King Christian II is crowned King of Norway in Oslo. This coronation was the last in Norway for 304 years when King  Charles III John was crowned king in 1818.

Arts and literature

Births

Full date unknown
Heine Havreki, priest (d.1576)

Deaths